Giovanni Barozzi (1420 – 1466) was a prelate of the Catholic Church who served as Bishop of Bergamo (1449–1465) and Patriarch of Venice (1465–1466).

Biography
On 5 Nov 1449, Giovanni Barozzi was appointed during the papacy of Pope Nicholas V as Bishop of Bergamo.
On 7 Jan 1465, he was appointed during the papacy of Pope Paul II as Patriarch of Venice.
He served as Patriarch of Venice until his death on 2 Apr 1466. He was a relative of Eugene IV and Paul II. Cousin of Paul II and Eugene IV the uncle. Created cardinal in pectore in 1464 or 1465, never published.

References

Further reading
 
 (for Chronology of Bishops) 
 (for Chronology of Bishops) 
 (for Chronology of Bishops) 
 (for Chronology of Bishops) 

1420 births
1466 deaths
15th-century Roman Catholic bishops in the Republic of Venice
15th-century Venetian people
Giovanni
Bishops appointed by Pope Nicholas V
Bishops appointed by Pope Paul II
Bishops of Bergamo